"The Light" is the Grammy-nominated second single from Common's 2000 album Like Water for Chocolate. It was produced by Jay Dee and features keyboards performed by James Poyser. It samples "Open Your Eyes" as performed by Bobby Caldwell and the drums from "You're Gettin' a Little Too Smart" by The Detroit Emeralds. Framed as a love letter, it is a confession of Common's love for a woman – specifically, his girlfriend at the time, Erykah Badu (in 2012, Common acknowledged in a video for RapGenius that the song was about her). Cynthia Fuchs of PopMatters describes it as a "charming, tender, and undeniably soulful declaration of affection and respect." The music video (directed by Nzingha Stewart) features Common, Erykah Badu and "recognizable sensual delights" including "a homemade Minnie Riperton cassette, a mango, a pink lava lamp [and] a deeply green water-beaded leaf."

"The Light" is Common's first single to chart on the Billboard Hot 100, where it peaked at #44. The song was listed at number 268 on Pitchfork Media's "Top 500 songs of the 2000s".

Overview

Reception
After the release of Like Water for Chocolate, the song almost immediately attained the status of one of hip hop's few "precious" love songs and women's anthems. It also reached Common's best chart positions: #44 on The Billboard Hot 100, #21 on the Rhythmic Top 40 chart and #12 on the Hot R&B/Hip-Hop Singles & Tracks chart. Additionally, it reached #13 on the Hot Rap Singles chart, a feat that Common had previously surpassed. Allmusic writer Steve Huey says that "The Light" as well as "The 6th Sense" are "quintessential Common, uplifting and thoughtful [songs that] helped bring him a whole new audience."

The song received a 2001 Grammy Award nomination for Best Rap Solo Performance.

Alternate versions
A live seven-minute version featuring vocals by Erykah Badu and Bilal, scratching by DJ Dummy, keyboards by James Poyser and Omar Edwards, bass guitar by Adam Blackstone, drums by Questlove, guitar by Kevin Hanson and percussion by Frank "Knuckles" Walker is featured on Dave Chappelle's Block Party 2006 soundtrack.
A remix featuring vocals by Erykah Badu was released by Motown Records as a single in 2000 for the Bamboozled soundtrack.
The original version is featured on compilations such as 2000's The Source Presents: Hip Hop Hits, Vol. 4, 2001's Grammy R&B/Rap Nominees 2001, 2001's  Pure R&B, Vol. 2, 2001's  Wrap It Up, 2004's The Hip Hop Box and 2006's Hip Hop: Gold.
"The Light '08 (It's Love)", a remake made by Common and producer Just Blaze, featuring Marsha Ambrosius, was released in 2008 for a Smirnoff advertising campaign.

Track listing

US version

A-side
 "The Light (Album Version)" (4:02)
 "The Light (Instrumental)" (4:07)
 "The Light (Acappella)" (3:42)

B-side
 "Funky for You (Album Version)" (4:28)
 "Funky for You (Instrumental)" (4:26)
 "Funky for You (Radio Edit)" (4:28)

Import

A-side
 "The Light (Album Version)"

B-side
 "The 6th Sense (Something U Feel) (Album Version)"
 "The Light (Instrumental)"

Remix

A-side
 "The Light (Remix) (Radio)" (4:01)
 "The Light (Remix) (Main)" (6:03)

B-side
 "The Light (Remix) (Instrumental)" (5:49)
 "The Light (Remix) (Acapella)" (5:56)

Charts

Weekly charts

Year-end charts

See also 
 Progressive rap

References

2000 songs
2000 singles
Common (rapper) songs
MCA Records singles
Music videos directed by Nzingha Stewart
Song recordings produced by J Dilla
Songs written by Bobby Caldwell
Songs written by J Dilla
Songs written by Common (rapper)